Rafael Gomes de Oliveira (born April 26, 1990 in Sao Paulo, Brazil), known as Rafinha, is a Brazilian professional footballer who plays as a winger.

Honours

Club
Operário Ferroviário
Campeonato Brasileiro Série C: 2018

References

External links

1990 births
Living people
Footballers from São Paulo
Brazilian footballers
Brazilian expatriate footballers
Expatriate footballers in Costa Rica
Expatriate footballers in Portugal
Expatriate footballers in Mexico
Expatriate footballers in Cyprus
Expatriate footballers in Indonesia
Expatriate footballers in Malaysia
Brazilian expatriate sportspeople in Costa Rica
Brazilian expatriate sportspeople in Portugal
Brazilian expatriate sportspeople in Mexico
Brazilian expatriate sportspeople in Cyprus
Brazilian expatriate sportspeople in Indonesia
Brazilian expatriate sportspeople in Malaysia
Red Bull Brasil players
São Paulo FC players
Guarani FC players
Ceará Sporting Club players
América Futebol Clube (RN) players
Portimonense S.C. players
Operário Ferroviário Esporte Clube players
Cafetaleros de Chiapas footballers
C.S. Herediano footballers
Brusque Futebol Clube players
Ermis Aradippou FC players
Persela Lamongan players
Negeri Sembilan FA players
PS Barito Putera players
Campeonato Brasileiro Série A players
Campeonato Brasileiro Série B players
Ascenso MX players
Cypriot First Division players
Liga 1 (Indonesia) players
Malaysia Super League players
Association football midfielders